The Last Resort is the debut album by the Danish electronic musician Trentemøller. It was released on 9 October 2006. The album debuted at #5 on the Danish Albums Chart. In Denmark, The Last Resort was certified platinum in October 2009 for sales over 30,000 copies, a rare feat for an electronic music album. It is also available in a Limited Edition which includes a bonus disc with some of Trentemøller's previous 12-inch singles.

Reception

Philip Sherburne of Pitchfork compared the album to Thom Yorke's The Eraser. Resident Advisor—an online magazine with a focus on electronic music—named The Last Resort as the fifth best album of 2006. They also named it the 28th best album of the decade. The Danish newspaper Politiken gave the album 5 out of 6 stars, and named it the second best Danish album of 2006, dubbing him "the hero of techno".

Track listing

Standard Edition
All songs written, produced, played and programmed by Trentemøller.

Limited Edition

Charts and certifications

Charts

Certifications 

In 2011 it was awarded a gold certification from the Independent Music Companies Association which indicated sales of at least 75,000 copies throughout Europe.

References

2006 debut albums
Trentemøller albums